UCD can refer to:

Education
University College Dublin, Irish university
University College Dublin A.F.C., the university's association football club 
University College Dublin RFC, the university's rugby union club 
UCD GAA, the university Gaelic games club
University of California, Davis

Science and technology
User-centered design
Use case diagram
Urine collection device
Ultra compact dwarf galaxy

Other
Unión Cívica Democrática
Union of the Democratic Centre (disambiguation), party name in various countries
Union of the Democratic Centre (Spain)
Union of the Democratic Centre (Argentina)